Summer Morning, Summer Night is a collection of short stories by American writer Ray Bradbury, edited by Donn Albright and Jon Eller and first published by in 2002 PS Publishing.  All the stories save one are set in Green Town, Illinois, Bradbury's name for his hometown of Waukegan, Illinois.  Several of the stories feature some of the characters from his 1957 book, Dandelion Wine.   Some stories are less than one page long.

Contents
The collection contains:
End of Summer (1948)
The Great Fire (1949)
All on a Summer's Night (1950) 
Miss Bidwell (1950)
The Pumpernickel (1951)
At Midnight, in the Month of June (1954)
A Walk in Summer (1979)
Autumn Afternoon (2002)
Arrival and Departure
The Beautiful Lady
Love Potion
Night Meeting
The Death of So-and-So
I Got Something You Ain't Got!
The Waders
The Dog
The River That Went to the Sea
Over, Over, Over, Over, Over, Over, Over, Over!
The Projector
The People with Seven Arms
A Serious Discussion (or Evil in the World)
The Fireflies
The Circus
The Cemetery (or The Tombyard)
Summer's End

References

External links
 
 

2007 short story collections
Short story collections by Ray Bradbury
PS Publishing books